Arctic studies may include:
Arctic ecology
Geology
Meteorology
Pedology
Oceanography

See also 
 List of Arctic research programs
 List of research stations in the Arctic

References

Earth sciences
Arctic research